Homer Township is one of twenty townships in Benton County, Iowa, USA.  As of the 2000 census, its population was 222.

Geography
According to the United States Census Bureau, Homer Township covers an area of 35.8 square miles (92.72 square kilometers).

Unincorporated towns
 Rogersville at 
(This list is based on USGS data and may include former settlements.)

Adjacent townships
 Monroe Township (north)
 Jackson Township (northeast)
 Big Grove Township (east)
 Union Township (southeast)
 Kane Township (south)
 York Township, Tama County (southwest)
 Oneida Township, Tama County (west)
 Clark Township, Tama County (northwest)

Cemeteries
The township contains these two cemeteries: Houghton and Twogood.

School districts
 Benton Community School District
 Union Community School District
 Vinton-Shellsburg Community School District

Political districts
 Iowa's 3rd congressional district
 State House District 39
 State Senate District 20

References
 United States Census Bureau 2007 TIGER/Line Shapefiles
 United States Board on Geographic Names (GNIS)
 United States National Atlas

External links

 
US-Counties.com
City-Data.com

Townships in Benton County, Iowa
Cedar Rapids, Iowa metropolitan area
Townships in Iowa